Kim Tae-yeon (born 1989) also known as Taeyeon is the main singer for Girls' Generation.

Kim Tae-yeon may also refer to:
 Kim Tae-yeon (actress) (born 1976), South Korean model and actress
 Kim Tae-yeon (painter) (born 1986), South Korean painter
 Kim Tae-yeon (footballer) (born 1988), South Korean football midfielder

See also
Kim Tae-yun (disambiguation)